Heikki Tapio Vääräniemi (born 21 December 1969, in Oulu) is a retired Finnish pole vaulter, who is nicknamed Väärä.

He finished eighth at the 1998 European Championships.

References

1969 births
Living people
Sportspeople from Oulu
Finnish male pole vaulters
Athletes (track and field) at the 1996 Summer Olympics
Olympic athletes of Finland